The mountain leaf-toed gecko (Hemidactylus montanus) is a species of gecko. It is endemic to Yemen. It is sometimes considered conspecific with Hemidactylus yerburyi.

References

Hemidactylus
Reptiles described in 2011
Reptiles of the Middle East
Endemic fauna of Yemen